Clitocine is a mushroom nucleoside isolate with anticancer activity in vitro.

References

Nucleosides